English River 66 is a First Nations reserve in Cochrane District, Ontario, Canada, located adjacent to the settlement of Mammamattawa and just downstream of the mouth of the Kabinakagami River at the Kenogami River.

History
A Hudson's Bay Company trading post was established in 1884 at the confluence of the Kenogami and Kabinakagami Rivers. It was known as the English River Post, as the Kenogami was also known as the English River. The English River First Nation, the primary forerunner to today's Constance Lake First Nation, had a reserve set aside for their use just north of the post in 1912, which remains part of the Constance Lake First Nations lands as English River 66 Indian Reserve.

References

External links
 Canada Lands Survey System

Oji-Cree reserves in Ontario
Communities in Cochrane District